Annelie Leitner (born 15 June 1996) is an Austrian footballer who plays as a forward for Spanish Segunda División Pro club Zaragoza CFF and the Austria women's national team.

Early life
Leitner was born to Austrian parents in Graz and grew up in Salzburg. In 2009, she emigrated to Guatemala because of her father's work.

Education and college career
Leitner has attended the Guatemalan Austrian Institute in Guatemala City and the Indiana University Bloomington in Bloomington, Indiana, United States.

Club career
Leitner is a SC Tamsweg and 1. SSK 1919 product. After moving to Guatemala, she has played for Pares-Unifut. During her time in the United States as a Indiana University Bloomington student, she also played for Indiana Invaders in the WLS. After graduation, she was signed by Hwacheon KSPO WFC in South Korea. She later played for Maccabi Kishronot Hadera FC in Israel and for Zaragoza CFF in Spain.

International career
At youth levels, Leitner has first played unofficially for Guatemala, while living there, and then officially for Austria. She made her senior debut for the latter on 14 June 2021 as an 82nd-minute substitution in a 2–3 friendly home defeat to Italy.

References

External links

1996 births
Living people
Footballers from Graz
Footballers from Salzburg
Austrian women's footballers
Women's association football forwards
FSK St. Pölten-Spratzern players
Indiana Hoosiers women's soccer players
Maccabi Kishronot Hadera F.C. players
Zaragoza CFF players
Frauen-Bundesliga players
WK League players
Segunda Federación (women) players
Austria women's international footballers
Austrian expatriate women's footballers
Austrian expatriate sportspeople in the United States
Expatriate women's soccer players in the United States
Austrian expatriate sportspeople in South Korea
Expatriate women's footballers in South Korea
Austrian expatriate sportspeople in Israel
Expatriate women's footballers in Israel
Austrian expatriate sportspeople in Spain
Expatriate women's footballers in Spain
Austrian emigrants
Immigrants to Guatemala
Naturalized citizens of Guatemala
Guatemalan women's footballers
Guatemalan people of European descent
North American people of Austrian descent
EdF Logroño players
Primera Federación (women) players